Judy Farr may refer to:

Sports
Judy Farr (racewalker) in 1975 IAAF World Race Walking Cup
Judy Farr (figure skater) in New Zealand Figure Skating Championships

Film and television
Judi Farr, (born 1938/1939) Australian actress
Judy Farr (set decorator), British set decorator

Other(s)
Judith Farr, writer, winner of Rose Mary Crawshay Prize